The Thing About December is a social novel written by Irish novelist Donal Ryan. It was first published in 2013 by The Lilliput Press in Ireland. It was published in the US in 2014 by Steerforth Press. It was shortlisted for the Irish Book Award for the Novel of the Year and longlisted for the International Dublin Literary Award in 2015.

References 

2013 Irish novels
Novels by Donal Ryan